Berg Church is a parish church of the Church of Norway in Senja Municipality in Troms og Finnmark county, Norway. It is located in the village of Skaland. It is the church for the Berg parish which is part of the Senja prosti (deanery) in the Diocese of Nord-Hålogaland. The white, stone church was built in a long church style in 1955 using plans drawn up by the architect Hans Magnus. The church seats about 225 people.

History
The earliest existing historical records of the church date back to the year 1589, but the church was not new that year. It was likely founded in the 15th century. The church was a long church with a small steeple over the nave and an entry porch. Starting in the mid-1600s, the local parishioners began complaining of the poor condition of the old church, however nothing was done.

Inspections of the building in 1753 and 1770 again noted that the church had fallen into disrepair. The priest at that time had requested that the church be moved to a location that was less rocky so that a cemetery around the church could be built. The priest's wish was not followed, however. The old church was torn down in 1780 and a new church was built in 1780–1781 on the same site. It also had a small sacristy.

In 1814, this church served as an election church. Together with more than 300 other parish churches across Norway, it was a polling station for elections to the 1814 Norwegian Constituent Assembly which wrote the Constitution of Norway. This was Norway's first national elections. Each church parish was a constituency that elected people called "electors" who later met together in each county to elect the representatives for the assembly that was to meet in Eidsvoll later that year.

In 1844, the church was thoroughly repaired and at the same time a new tower on the west end was constructed along with a new sacristy. In 1884, the church was renovated and expanded. During World War II in 1942, the church was demolished by the occupying German army.

The altarpiece carved in wood was decorated by Torvald Kildal Moseid (1917-2000). Moseid also designed the stained glass in the church. The church bell is from Olsen Nauen Bell Foundry (Olsen Nauen Klokkestøperi).

Media gallery

See also
List of churches in Nord-Hålogaland

References

Senja
Churches in Troms
Stone churches in Norway
20th-century Church of Norway church buildings
Churches completed in 1955
15th-century establishments in Norway
Norwegian election church
Long churches in Norway